The Chatham County Public School System is a school district located in Chatham County, North Carolina and is operated by an elected school board. The school district currently operates 17 schools throughout the county.

High schools 

There are three traditional public high schools and two alternative high schools:

Northwood High School in Pittsboro

Jordan-Matthews High School in Siler City

Chatham Central High School in Bear Creek

SAGE Academy in Siler City

Chatham School of Science & Engineering in Siler City

Seaforth High School near Jordan Lake

Middle schools 
The district operates three middle schools:

Chatham Middle School (6-8) located in Siler City
 
Margaret B. Pollard Middle School (6-8) located in Chapel Hill
 
Horton Middle School (5-8) located in Pittsboro.

Elementary Schools & Primary Schools 
The district operates 5 elementary schools (serving grades K-8):

Bennett School located in Bennett

Bonlee School located in Bonlee

J.S. Waters School located near Goldston

Moncure School located in Moncure

Silk Hope School located in Silk Hope

The district also operates 6 primary schools (serving up to grade 5):

Chatham Grove Elementary School (K-5) in Chapel Hill

North Chatham Elementary School (K-5) in Chapel Hill

Perry W. Harrison Elementary School (K-5) in Pittsboro

Pittsboro Elementary School (K-4)  also in Pittsboro

Siler City Elementary School (PreK-5)  in Siler City

Virginia Cross Elementary School (K-5) also in Siler City.

There is also a More at Four Pre-kindergarten center at Paul Braxton Children's Center in Siler City as well as several of schools in the county.

Bennett School controversy 

In 2006, the Chatham County Board of Education announced that they were repealing a decision that allowed students that lived in the Randolph County portion of Bennett to attend Bennett School, the local K-8 school, free of charge. For years students from both counties that lived in "Bennett" were allowed to attend the school free under a memorandum of understanding between the two counties made many years ago. The announcement that the memorandum was being repealed stirred a firestorm of controversy, since the Randolph County students would be considered out-of-district students and could therefore be charged hundreds of dollars each year to attend school in Chatham County. The commute to the nearest Randolph County school was also a problem since it is located many miles from Bennett. To date, the Chatham County board has stood by its decision despite numerous complaints from 
residents.

Construction updates 
In January 2009, a Chatham County Schools press release confirmed the groundbreaking of a new middle school. Margaret B. Pollard Middle School is located near Briar Chapel, in northeastern Chatham County. The 6th, 7th, and 8th grade students of Perry Harrison and North Chatham were moved here in January 2011.

References

External links 
Chatham County Schools Official Site
Chatham County Schools Official Wiki

School districts in North Carolina
Education in Chatham County, North Carolina